The genotype–phenotype map is a conceptual model in genetic architecture. Coined in a 1991 paper by Pere Alberch, it models the interdependency of genotype (an organism's full hereditary information) with phenotype (an organism's actual observed properties).

Application
The map visualises a relationship between genotype & phenotype which, crucially:
 is of greater complexity than a straightforward one-to-one mapping of genotype to/from phenotype.
 accommodates a parameter space, along which at different points a given phenotype is said to be more or less stable.
 accommodates transformational boundaries in the parameter space, which divide phenotype states from one another.
 accounts for different polymorphism and/or polyphenism in populations, depending on their area of parameter space they occupy.

References

Genetics
1991 introductions